The following is a timeline of the history of the city of Ferrara in the Emilia-Romagna region of Italy.

Prior to 17th century

 7th century
 San Giorgio Cathedral built.
 Benedictine Pomposa Abbey founded near Ferrara (approximate date).
 624 - Roman Catholic diocese of Ferrara active.
 753 - Lombards in power.
 774 - Archbishop of Ravenna in power.
 988 - Tedald of Canossa in power.
 1055 - "Imperial privileges" granted.
 1101 - Ferrara besieged by forces of Matilda of Tuscany.
 1115 - Ferrara becomes a "free commune."
 1158 - Frederick I, Holy Roman Emperor in power.
 1196 - Azzo VI of Este becomes podesta.
 1227 - San Francesco church built.
 1240 - City besieged; Azzo VII d'Este in power.
 1243 - Palazzo Ducale built.
 1249 - Sant'Antonio in Polesine monastery founded.
 1264 - Obizzo II d'Este, Marquis of Ferrara in power.
 1278 - Ferarra becomes part of the Papal States.
 1283 - Torre del Rigobello (tower) built.
 1313 - Riccobaldo da Ferrara begins writing his Chronica parva Ferrariensis
 1317 - Obizzo III d'Este, Marquis of Ferrara in power.
 1326 - Palazzo della Ragione built.
 1333 - "Papal forces making a bid for more control in the province were defeated at Ferrara."
 1382 - Plague.
 1385
 Economic unrest.
 Castello Estense (castle) and Palazzo Schifanoia construction begins.
 1391
 University of Ferrara established.
 Palazzo Paradiso built.
 1393 - Niccolò III d'Este, Marquis of Ferrara in power.
 1435 - Castello Nuovo (castle) built.
 1438 - Religious Council of Ferrara held.
 1441 - Leonello d'Este, Marquis of Ferrara in power.
 1450 - Borso d'Este in power.
 1452 - Birth of future religious leader Savonarola.
 1461 - Certosa of Ferrara built.
 1471
 Printing press in operation.
 Ercole I d'Este, Duke of Ferrara in power.
  walkway built.
 1482 - War of Ferrara begins.
 1484 - War of Ferrara ends; Venetian forces win.
 1492 - Addizione Erculea development begins.
 1493 - Palazzo dei Diamanti construction begins.
 1516 - Ariosto's poem Orlando Furioso published in Ferrara.
 1570 - November: 1570 Ferrara earthquake.
 1598 - Ferrara becomes part of the Papal States.

17th-19th centuries
 1602 - Teatro della Sala Grande (theatre) built.
 1608 - Castel Tedaldo demolished.
 1753 - Biblioteca Comunale Ariostea (library) opens in the Palazzo Paradiso.
 1771 - University of Ferrara Botanic Garden founded.
 1796 - City "occupied by Napoleonic troops" (until 1815).
 1798 - Teatro Comunale (Ferrara) (theatre) opens.
 1823 - Accademia delle Scienze di Ferrara (learned society) formed.
 1836 - Pinacoteca Nazionale di Ferrara (museum) established in the Palazzo dei Diamanti.
 1838 - Teatro Montecatini (theatre) active.
 1846 - Teatro Bonacossi (theatre) active.
 1847 - Austrians take city.
 1859 - Austrians ousted; Ferrara becomes part of the Kingdom of Italy.
 1861 - Population: 64,204.
 1868 - Teatro Accademico (theatre) opens.
 1872 -  (museum) opens.
 1897 - Population: 89,310.

20th century

 1901
  begins operating.
 Ferrara Camera del Lavoro (labor centre) founded.
 1903 -  begins operating.
 1911 - Population: 95,212.
 1912 - Birth of future filmmaker Antonioni.
 1920 - 20 December:  (political unrest).
 1925 -  newspaper begins publication.
 1926 -  (theatre) opens.
 1943 - 15 November:  (political unrest).
 1944 - Bombing during World War II.
 1955 - Archivio di Stato di Ferrara (state archives) established.
 1961 - Population: 152,654.
 1971 - City divided into 13 administrative frazione: Baura, Fossanova San Marco, Francolino, Gaibanella, Marrara, Mizzana, Pontegradella, Pontelagoscuro, Porotto, Quartesana, Ravalle, San Bartolomeo in Bosco, and San Martino; and 9 quartieri: , Barco, Centro cittadino, Giardino, Mizzana, Porta Mare, Quacchio, San Giorgio, and Via Bologna.(it)
 1973 - Istituto di Storia Contemporanea di Ferrara (history society) founded.
 1989 -  newspaper begins publication.
 1999 -  becomes mayor.

21st century

 2009 - Tiziano Tagliani becomes mayor.
 2014 - Population: 133,485.
 2019 - Alan Fabbri becomes mayor.

See also
 
 List of mayors of Ferrara
 List of dukes of Ferrara

Timelines of other cities in the macroregion of Northeast Italy:(it)
 Emilia-Romagna region: Timeline of Bologna; Forlì; Modena; Parma; Piacenza; Ravenna; Reggio Emilia; Rimini
 Friuli-Venezia Giulia region: Timeline of Trieste
 Trentino-South Tyrol region: Timeline of Bolzano; Trento
 Veneto region: Timeline of Padua; Treviso; Venice; Verona; Vicenza

References

This article incorporates information from the Italian Wikipedia.

Bibliography

in English
 
  (includes information about Ferrara circa 14th-16th century)

 
 
 
 
  + 1870 ed.

in Italian

External links

  (city archives)
 Items related to Ferrara, various dates (via Europeana)
 Items related to Ferrara, various dates (via Digital Public Library of America)

Ferrara
Ferrara